"Let Your Soul Be Your Pilot" is a song by the English musician Sting. It was released as the lead single from his fifth solo studio album Mercury Falling on 13 February 1996. The soul-influenced track was inspired by a friend suffering from AIDS, and the impact such an event can have on one's outlook on life.

"Let Your Soul Be Your Pilot" reached the top 20 in Sting's native UK. The song was nominated for Best Male Pop Vocal Performance at the 1997 Grammy Awards.

Background

"Let Your Soul Be Your Pilot" was inspired by a friend of Sting's who was suffering from AIDS. Sting described it as a "song about death, or dealing with death in a way that offers some sort of hope".

Musically, the song was influenced by Stax artists such as Otis Redding; Percy Sledge and Aretha Franklin were also listed as significant influences. Fitting in with this theme, Sting brought in the Memphis Horns to play on the track.

"Let Your Soul Be Your Pilot" became a top 20 hit in the UK, peaking at number 15. The single was less successful in the US, reaching number 86 on the Billboard Hot 100, although it did better on the Adult Alternative Airplay chart, peaking at number 3. It found its greatest success in Canada, where it entered the top 10, reaching number 7.

Track listing

All tracks written by Sting, except "Someone to Watch Over Me" written by George and Ira Gershwin.

Standard CD single

 "Let Your Soul Be Your Pilot" (Edit) – 4:31
 "Englishman in New York" – 4:27
 "The Bed's Too Big Without You" – 6:05
 "Let Your Soul Be Your Pilot" (LP Version) – 6:41

CD maxi–single (US and Japan)

 "Let Your Soul Be Your Pilot" (LP Version) – 6:41
 "The Bed's Too Big Without You" – 6:05
 "Someone to Watch Over Me" – 4:00
 "Englishman in New York" – 4:27

Remixes by A & G Division

 "Let Your Soul Be Your Pilot" (A & G Classic Edit) – 4:38
 "Let Your Soul Be Your Pilot" (A & G Full Testament Mix) – 12:32
 "Let Your Soul Be Your Pilot" (A & G Great Divide Mix) – 7:40
 "Let Your Soul Be Your Pilot" (A & G Great Divide Dub) – 12:29

Charts

References

1996 songs
1996 singles
Songs written by Sting (musician)
Sting (musician) songs